Mount Baker is a mountain on the Continental Divide, in Alberta and British Columbia, in the Waputik Mountains of the Canadian Rockies. It was named in 1898 by J. Norman Collie after his friend and climbing partner George Percival Baker (1855–1951), textile manufacturer, plantsman and gardener, and keen mountaineer. Baker described his visit to this area which took place in 1897. In this small volume Baker noted that Collie also proposed to name a pass after him. 
Collie and Baker were accompanied by Peter Sarbach, and for the first week by H. B. Dixon as well as American members of the Appalachian Mountain Club. Mount Sarbach was named at the same time, as well as several other peaks: "We now named the peaks, after presidents of the Club of our time, Freshfield, Dent, Pilkington, and Walker."

The mountain has been wrongly identified as "Stremotch Mountain" on subsequent maps and documents after a first map that was submitted by C.S. Thompson to the Surveyor General and subsequently printed in "Map of the Wapta Icefield" in Canadian Alpine Journal Vol 1, No 1, 1907, p.151.

Nearby
 Mount Patterson :  : North (line parent)
 Trapper Peak :  : North North East
 Mount Habel :  : South East

See also
List of peaks on the Alberta–British Columbia border

References

Three-thousanders of Alberta
Three-thousanders of British Columbia
Canadian Rockies
Alberta's Rockies